Hadsund Butikscenter is a shopping mall and town square located in Hadsund, Denmark. It opened on 16 August 1975. Shopping center has 1.1 million annual visitors.

Shopping Centre is located in the northern part of the city's pedestrian zone Store Street. It is arranged over 2 floors with an escalator. At the center of the square there is a fountain and sculpture was donated by the Bank Hadsund by shopping center's inauguration.

Shopping Centre was opened in 1975 and was the first one udedørs center in the form of a shopping high street, but was associated with an extensive renovation in 1979, a covered mall.

The mall has about 18 stores.

The center includes stores like:
 Matas
 Marcus
 Netto
 Intersport

History 
Shopping Centre is housed in Bdr. Johan & Axel Horn Bech old jam factory buildings were built in 1898 and extended in 1916. On 8 December 1974 the company moved into the industrial area Hadsund North. And three months later dropped the plant's chimney. Jam factory was in 1986 part of Scandic Food. Jam Factory which was the oldest of work closed in 2011.

Hornbech Jam had its headquarters in Hadsund, but also had a small office in Copenhagen. Hornbech Marmalade, received many awards for their jam including in England and Germany. Hornbech Jam produced today by Scandic Food. Hornbecs's buildings is the day to keep. It comprises the eastern part of the center.

References

External links

  Hadsund Butikscenters website
  Hadsund Trade association
  a page about Hadsund

Hadsund
Shopping centres in Denmark
Buildings and structures in Mariagerfjord Municipality